Goschen or Göschen is a surname of German origin. It may refer to:

People
Arthur Goschen (1880–1975), British Army officer
Sir Edward Goschen, 1st Baronet (1847–1924), British diplomat
Georg Joachim Göschen (1752–1828), German printer
George Goschen, 1st Viscount Goschen (1831–1907), British banker and politician
George Goschen, 2nd Viscount Goschen (1866–1952),  British politician
Giles Goschen, 4th Viscount Goschen (born 1965),  British politician
Johann Friedrich Ludwig Göschen (1778–1837), German jurist
John Goschen, 3rd Viscount Goschen (1906–1977),  British politician
Oskar Göschen (1824–1900), German herald
Otto Göschen (1808–1865), German legal scholar

Other
Viscount Goschen
Goschen baronets
Goschen formula
Goschen, Victoria, locality in Australia
Goschen, Lieberose, locality in Germany

See also
Goshen

German-language surnames